Tywyn (Welsh: ; in English often ), formerly spelled Towyn, is a town, community, and seaside resort on the Cardigan Bay coast of southern Gwynedd, Wales. It was previously in the historic county of Merionethshire. It is famous as the location of the Cadfan Stone, a stone cross with the earliest known example of written Welsh, and the home of the Talyllyn Railway.

Origins of the name
The name derives from the Welsh tywyn ('beach, seashore, sand-dune'). The place-name element tywyn is found in many other parts of Wales, most notably Towyn near Abergele and Porth Tywyn (Burry Port).

In Middle Welsh, the spelling was generally Tywyn. In the Early Modern period, however, the spelling Towyn became common in Welsh in order to reflect a slight change in pronunciation. That also came to be the usual spelling in English up to the latter part of the twentieth century. 

The modern spelling Tywyn better reflects the current pronunciation in modern Welsh as spoken in north Wales. With the standardisation of the orthography of the Welsh language in the first part of the 20th century, the spelling Tywyn came to dominate. A referendum was held in 1968, with residents being asked to decide between Tywyn or Towyn. In the 1970s Tywyn was accepted as the official name of the town in both languages.

In Welsh, the town is sometimes referred to as Tywyn Meirionnydd. In origin, this usage probably refers to the cantref of Meirionnydd, but is now generally understood as referring to the historical county of the same name. In English, during the late nineteenth century and until the middle of the twentieth century, the town was sometimes called Towyn-on-Sea.

History
Tywyn was the location of the first religious community administered by the Breton saint Cadfan upon his arrival in Gwynedd in the early 6th century, prior to his departure he founded a monastery on Bardsey Island off the Llyn Peninsula.  The church contains some early material (see below).

Location

The town's historic centre lies about a kilometre from the beach, around St Cadfan's Church. In the second half of the nineteenth century the town expanded considerably, mainly towards the sea.

To the north of the town lie the reclaimed salt marshes of Morfa Tywyn and Morfa Gwyllt, beyond which lie the Broad Water lagoon and the mouth of the Afon Dysynni. To the north-east lie the rich farmland of Bro Dysynni and the village of Bryncrug, and to the east the hills of Craig y Barcud and Craig Fach Goch. To the south towards Aberdyfi is the mouth of the Afon Dyffryn Gwyn and Morfa Penllyn.

The Tywyn coastal defence scheme, officially unveiled on 24 March 2011 by Jane Davidson (then Welsh Assembly Government Minister for Environment, Sustainability and Housing), provides a rock breakwater above the low-tide level, rock groynes, and rock revetment to protect 80 sea-front properties. The costs of this civil engineering project was £7.62M, shared between the Welsh Assembly Government (£4.135M) and the European Union's Regional Development Fund (£3.485M).

Demography and language 

At the time of the 2001 census, 40.5% of the population were recorded as Welsh speakers. By the 2011 census this had decreased to 37.5%. An Estyn inspection report in 2016 noted that about 22% of the children at the school came from Welsh-speaking homes.

The town's Welsh dialect has several notable features, with one Victorian observer stating that three languages were spoken there: English, Welsh and 'Tywynaeg'.  During the 1860s, in the town's British School, a 'Welsh stick' (a version of the Welsh Not) was used to punish children who were caught speaking Welsh in school. Yet Welsh was the dominant language in Tywyn until the middle of the 20th century. L T C Rolt in his book 'Railway Adventure' recounts walking up the track of the Talyllyn Railway in 1950, and stopping to speak to railway workers only to discover they spoke no English. Tywyn is now a very anglicised town, with the majority of its population (52.8%) having been born in England according to the 2011 census. Likewise, slightly more respondents claimed an English-only identity (35.0%) than a Welsh-only identity (33.7%).

Transport and tourism 
The church is of interest for two medieval effigies, and for a stone inscribed with what is believed to be the oldest known writing in the Welsh language, dating back to the 8th century AD, and rescued from a local gateway in the 18th century.

Improved transport links during the 19th century increased Tywyn's appeal as a tourist destination. In the early decades of that century, a creek of the river Dysynni allowed ships to approach the town's northern fringes, where there was a shipbuilding yard. The draining of the salt marsh and the channelling of the river brought this industry to an end, but during the early part of that century the town was made more accessible by building new roads along the coast to Aberdyfi and Llwyngwril.

The railway arrived in the mid-1860s (first as the Aberystwith and Welsh Coast Railway, then as Cambrian Railways), and had a significant effect on the town. Tywyn railway station opened in 1863. The station is still open, and is served by the Cambrian Line.

Slate-quarrying in the Abergynolwyn area led to the building in 1865 of the Talyllyn Railway, a narrow-gauge line designed to carry slates to Tywyn. Two stations were opened in the town. Tywyn Wharf railway station was originally opened to enable slates to be unloaded onto a wharf adjacent to the main railway line. It is now the Talyllyn's western terminus and principal station. Pendre railway station was originally the passenger station, and now houses the locomotive and carriage sheds and works.

Notable visitors who stayed at Tywyn in the 19th century include:
 Thomas Love Peacock (1811, at Botalog)
 Thomas Fremantle, 1st Baron Cottesloe (1818)
 Ignatius Spencer (1818)
 Charles Darwin (1819, at Plas Edwards)
 William Morris (1875)
 Elizabeth Blackwell (exact date uncertain, at Brynarfor)

The beach and its extensive promenade have long been key attractions. In 1877, a pier was built at Tywyn, but the structure only lasted a few months. The street called 'Pier Road', which leads from the town to the beach, offers a suggestion as to its location. The promenade was completed in 1889 at the cost of some £30,000, paid for by John Corbett (1817–1901) of Ynysymaengwyn.

There has been extensive bungalow and caravan development in the vicinity.

Other industries 
Apart from tourism, agriculture has long been the most important industry in the area. Lead and copper used to be mined in the town's hinterland.

The Marconi Company built a Long Wave receiver station in Tywyn in 1914, working in duplex with the high-power transmitter station near Waunfawr. In 1921 the Tywyn and Waunfawr stations initiated a transatlantic wireless telegraph service with a similar RCA wireless transmitting station in New Brunswick, New Jersey, USA and RCA's receiver station in Belmar, New Jersey. This new transatlantic service replaced Marconi's obsolete transatlantic telegraph station in Clifden, Ireland following its 1922 destruction during the Irish Civil War.

For most of the 20th century, the armed forces were a significant presence in Tywyn. The town was a major training ground for the amphibious warfare landings in the Second World War and had a strategic war base. Abandoned pillboxes may still be seen on the coast to the south of the town. The links with the armed forces came to an end when the Joint Service Mountain Training Centre at Morfa Camp closed in 1999. Morfa camp is now in private ownership and many buildings are let as small storage units.

Facilities and notable features 
Much of the town's infrastructure was put in place by an industrialist from the English Midlands, John Corbett, who in the 1870s decided to develop the town into a major tourist resort to rival Torquay. As well as constructing a row of boarding houses and a grand esplanade, he developed the water and sewerage system. He gave land and money for a new Market Hall, built to celebrate Queen Victoria's Diamond Jubilee in 1897. He paid for Brynarfor (formerly a private school originally called the Towyn Academy and then Brynarvor Hall School) to be opened as 'Towyn Intermediate School' in 1894. He refurbished the Corbet Arms Hotel (from then on spelled with two 't's), and also contributed to the Assembly Room (1893), now Tywyn Cinema. Plaques commemorating his generosity may still be seen on the north end of the promenade and on the Market Hall. Another commemorative plaque was on Brynarfor (now demolished), and his portrait was hung there when the school first opened. However, the anticipated grand watering-place never took off, and these additions to the town were never matched.

In 1912, a drill hall was built in the Pendre area of the town for the Territorial Army (the 7th Battalion the Royal Welsh Fusiliers). The hall, now known as Neuadd Pendre, has recently been renovated, mainly with money from the National Lottery Big Lottery Fund and the Welsh Government. The hall houses a 3-manual 9-rank Wurlitzer Organ which was originally installed in a cinema in Woolwich in 1937.

After the First World War money was raised to build both the Tywyn Cottage Hospital (opened in 1922) and the Tywyn Institute (opened by David Lloyd George in 1926). The hospital is still in operation, but the institute is now closed. It was the location of the town's library before a new library building was built next to it in the early 1970s.

The main schools in Tywyn are the primary school, Ysgol Penybryn, and the secondary school, Ysgol Uwchradd Tywyn.

Local places of interest include Craig yr Aderyn (Bird Rock), Castell y Bere, Llanfendigaid Estate and Llyn Myngul (Tal-y-llyn Lake). Hen Dyffryn Gwyn is a Grade II listed building dating from 1640 which retains many of its original features.

Religion 
For many centuries, St Cadfan's church was the only place of worship in the town, but since the 19th century there have been several.

Following the Methodist Revival, the Calvinistic Methodists established a cause (i.e. a branch) in Tywyn at the end of the 18th century. Bethel Calvinistic Methodist Church (Welsh-speaking Presbyterian Church of Wales) was established in 1815. The current chapel was built in 1871 and altered in 1887. The chapel closed in early 2010 but services are still held in the vestry.

Bethany Calvinistic Methodist Chapel (English-speaking Presbyterian Church of Wales) was also built in 1871 as one of the 'Inglis Côs' ('English cause') chapels that were advocated by Lewis Edwards and fiercely criticised by Emrys ap Iwan. It was opened in part with a view to attracting the increasing numbers of visitors who were coming to Tywyn since the opening of the railway and who previously had been provided for only by the English services at St Cadfan's. The noted pacifist George Maitland Lloyd Davies was minister of Bethany and also of Maethlon Chapel in nearby Cwm Maethlon (Happy Valley) between 1926 and 1930. Bethany closed in 2016.

Ebeneser (Welsh-speaking Wesleyan Methodist Church in Wales) was first built between 1817 and 1820, with the current building dating from 1883. John Cadvan Davies (1846–1923), Archdruid of Wales in 1923, was minister of Ebeneser between 1889 and 1892.

Bethesda Independent Chapel (Welsh-speaking Congregationalist) was first built in 1820, enlarged in 1865 and rebuilt again in 1892. It closed in January 2010.

Tywyn Baptist Church (English-speaking) was opened in 1900 and re-built in its present form in 1991.

The Church of St David is the town's Roman Catholic church and is part of Dolgellau Deanery. In its grounds is a sculpture of St David in Welsh slate by John Skelton.

Sport 
In Samuel Lewis's A Topographical Dictionary of Wales (1833) it is reported that popular horse races were held on land to the north of the town every September. Between 1904 and 1947, Towyn Golf Club (originally the Towyn-on-Sea Golf Club) was also located on land to the north of the town.

The Towyn-on-Sea club opened with a 10-hole course in 1904, in 1906 a further eight holes were added. Attempts were made to re-establish the club following the Second World War but these proved unsuccessful.

In the past Tywyn has had a rugby union team, and it now shares a football team with neighbouring Bryncrug (Tywyn & Bryncrug F.C.), playing their home matches in the village of Bryncrug. It also has a cricket club, Tywyn and District CC and a hockey team known as Dysynni Hockey Club. Also based in Tywyn is the Bro Dysynni Athletics Club.

Notable people 

See :Category:People from Tywyn

 The Anwyl family of Tywyn, direct male line descendants of Rhodri ab Owain Gwynedd, a member of the House of Aberffraw 
 Arthur ap Huw (fl. 1555–1570), vicar of St Cadfan's 1555/1570, notable patron of Welsh poets, and translator of counter-Reformation literature into Welsh.
 Martin J. Ball (born 1951) professor in Linguistics at Bangor University.
 Tom Bradshaw (born 1992), footballer with over 360 club caps and 3 for Wales
 Robert L. Chidlaw-Roberts (1896–1989), World War I flying ace. 
 Robin Davies (1954–2010), Welsh TV and film actor; starred in Catweazle playing the part of Carrot.
 Evan Evans (1731– 1788), bardic name Ieuan Fardd, poet and scholar, curate of St Cadfan's 1772/1777.
 Edward Ernest Hughes (1877–1953), the first professor of history at University College, Swansea, was born in Tywyn, the son of a local policeman.
 Griffith Hughes (1707–c.1758) clergyman from the parish of Tywyn, author of The Natural History of Barbados.
 John Ceiriog Hughes (1832–1887), poet, stationmaster at Tywyn for a short period from 1870.
 Joseph David Jones (1827–1870), musician, schoolmaster at Tywyn British School from 1851 to 1855.
 Sir Henry Haydn Jones (1863–1950), MP for Merioneth, brought up and lived in Tywyn.
 John Daniel Jones (1865–1942), Congregationalist minister, brought up in Tywyn.
 Owen Wynne Jones (1828–1870), bardic name Glasynys, Welsh cleric, antiquary, author and poet.
 Dai Lloyd (born 1956), Plaid Cymru politician and Member of the National Assembly for Wales, was born in Tywyn.
 David Richards (1751–1827), bardic name Dafydd Ionawr, poet, from Glanymorfa is the author of an englyn to his mother Ann Dafydd (d. 1785) which is preserved on a brass plate in St Cadfan's Church.
 R. Bryn Williams (1902–1981), bardic name Bryn, Welsh-language writer, poet, playwright and historian; lived in Patagonia as a child.

See also 

 Towyn power station

References

External links 

 Visit Tywyn
 Tywyn an illustrated guide
 bbc.co.uk North West Wales: Tywyn
 Tywyn Information
 www.geograph.co.uk : photos of Tywyn and surrounding area

 
Towns in Gwynedd
Transatlantic telecommunications